Intan may refer to:

People
 Intan Erlita (born 1980), an Indonesian TV presenter
 Intan Paramaditha, an Indonesian author
 Intan Azura Mokhtar (born 1976), a Singaporean politician
 Jamahidaya Intan (born 1996), a Malaysian cricketer

Other uses
 National Institute of Public Administration (Malaysia) (INTAN; Malay: Institut Tadbiran Awam Negara)
 Yogyakarta Institute of Agriculture (INTAN; Indonesian: Institut Pertanian Yogyakarta), see List of universities in Yogyakarta
 HD 20868 or Intan, a star in the Constellation Fornax
 Intan (TV series), an Indonesian soap opera

See also

 Intan Jaya Regency, Papua, Indonesia
 Teluk Intan (disambiguation)